Millicent Feilicity Hikuam (born 6 July 1998) is a Namibian footballer who plays as a midfielder for the Namibia women's national team.

International career
Hikuam capped for Namibia at senior level during the 2018 COSAFA Women's Championship.

References

1998 births
Living people
Namibian women's footballers
Namibia women's international footballers
Women's association football midfielders